A post in ground construction, also called earthfast or hole-set posts, is a type of construction in which vertical, roof-bearing timbers, called posts, are in direct contact with the ground. They may be placed into excavated postholes, driven into the ground, or on sills which are set on the ground without a foundation. Earthfast construction is common from the Neolithic period to the present and is used worldwide. Post-in-the-ground construction is sometimes called an "impermanent" form, used for houses which are expected to last a decade or two before a better quality structure can be built.

Post in ground construction can also include sill on grade, wood-lined cellars, and pit houses. Most pre-historic and medieval wooden dwellings worldwide were built post in ground.

History
This type of construction is often believed  to be an intermediate form between a palisade construction and a stave construction. Because the postholes are easily detected in archaeological surveys, they can be distinguished from the other two.

Post in ground was one of the timber construction methods used for French colonial structures in New France; it was called poteaux-en-terre.

The Japanese also used a type of earthfast construction until the eighteenth century, which they call Hottate-bashira (literally "embedded pillars").

The Dogon people in Africa use post in ground construction for their toguna, community gathering places typically located in the center of villages for official and informal meetings.

Poteaux-en-terre

In the historical region of New France in North America, poteaux-en-terre was a historic style of earthfast timber framing. This method is similar to poteaux-sur-sol, but the boulin (hewn posts) are planted in the ground rather than landing on a sill plate. The spaces between the boulin are filled with bousillage (reinforced mud) or pierrotage (stones and mud). Surviving examples of both types of structures can be found at Ste. Genevieve, Missouri.

Gallery of poteaux-en-terre

See also
French colonization of the Americas
Old Spanish Fort (Pascagoula, Mississippi). The La Pointe-Krebs House.
Pit-house
Post church
Ste. Genevieve, Missouri
Stilt house

References

External links

 EARTHFAST ARCHITECTURE IN EARLY MAINE 
 Earthfast Architecture at the Association for the Preservation of Virginia Antiquities

Building engineering
History of construction
New France
French-Canadian culture in the United States
French-American culture in Missouri
Missouri culture
French colonial architecture
Foundations (buildings and structures)

ja:掘立柱